Front Fountain is a fountain designed by Hooper & Watkins, installed outside the British Columbia Parliament Buildings, in Victoria, British Columbia. It was manufactured in 1905, by Joseph W. Fiske in New York, and installed in 1906. The fountain has one large ceramic tile basin with a granite rim. It once had four basins.

References

External links
 

1906 establishments in British Columbia
1906 sculptures
Fountains in Canada
Outdoor sculptures in Victoria, British Columbia